Denmark was represented by Tommy Seebach and Debbie Cameron, with the song "Krøller eller ej", at the 1981 Eurovision Song Contest, which took place on 4 April in Dublin. "Krøller eller ej" was chosen as the Danish entry at the Dansk Melodi Grand Prix on 28 February. Seebach had previously represented Denmark at Eurovision in 1979, when Cameron was one of his backing singers.

Before Eurovision

Dansk Melodi Grand Prix 1981 
The Dansk Melodi Grand Prix 1981 was held at the Valencia-Varieteen in Copenhagen, hosted by Jørgen Mylius. Five songs took part with the winner being decided by a jury made up of members of the public.

At Eurovision 
On the night of the final Seebach and Cameron performed 6th in the running order, following Israel and preceding Yugoslavia. At the close of voting "Krøller eller ej" had received 41 points, placing Denmark 11th of the 20 entries. The Danish jury awarded its 12 points to the host nation Ireland.

Voting

References 

1981
Countries in the Eurovision Song Contest 1981
Eurovision